Scythris dicroa is a moth species of the family Scythrididae. It was described by Mark I. Falkovitsh in 1972. It is found in Uzbekistan.

References

dicroa
Moths described in 1972
Moths of Asia